rio is Plan 9 from Bell Labs' windowing system. It is well known for making its window management transparent to the application. This allows running rio inside of another window manager.

History

rio is the latest in a long series of graphical user interfaces developed at Bell Labs, mostly developed by Rob Pike, the concurrent window system, and the Blit (which predated X).

rio was a complete rewrite of 8½ in Alef. Its main change was that it stopped parsing and rewriting graphical commands and let the client write pixels directly. This was done mainly for efficiency. As Alef disappeared due to being too difficult to maintain given the number of people working on Plan 9 at the time, rio was rewritten in C. This was done using the Plan 9 thread library which was inspired by Alef and had most of its features, such as blocking channels for interthread and interprocess communication. Another important change, due more to the environment than to rio per se, is that rio supports full colour, using alpha compositing, whereas 8½ uses bitblt operations.

Design concepts
Many of its features embody key Plan 9 design concepts:
 Each window runs in its own private namespace.
 It exports a file system interface to running applications. This interface is the same rio receives from the operating system, so rio can run inside a rio window without any special arrangements. Because the interface uses 9P, rio is network transparent even if it doesn't include any network-aware code.
 Windows are treated as completely editable text.

See also
 Plan 9 from Bell Labs - rio's native environment
 Plan 9 from User Space - Includes a window manager that emulates the rio user interface
 Rob Pike - The author of rio and 8½
 Blit - A terminal developed at Bell Labs that pioneered some of the UI concepts used in Rio.

External links

Rio: Design of a Concurrent Window System by Rob Pike

The 8½ paper - Describes rio's predecessor which had a very similar design

2002 software
Free software programmed in C
Free windowing systems
Plan 9 from Bell Labs